is a Japanese voice actress formerly affiliated with Production Baobab, and now with Sigma Seven. She has voiced in a number of anime shows and films. Some of her major roles are Allen Walker in D.Gray-man, Miyuki Tanokura in Kaze no Yojimbo, Akira Toya in Hikaru no Go, Asuka Tenjouin in Yu-Gi-Oh! GX, Chris Thorndyke in Sonic X, Natsumi Raimon in Inazuma Eleven, and Satsuki Kitaoji in Strawberry 100%. In more recent works, she voices Namie Yagiri in Durarara!!, Reiko Natsume in Natsume's Book of Friends, and Canon Memphis-Hazama in Fafner: Exodus. In video games, she voices Gemini Sunrise in Sakura Wars New York NY, Pai in .hack, Popo and Nana in the Super Smash Bros. series, and Kat in Gravity Rush.

Filmography

Anime

Film

Drama CD

Video games

Dubbing

Live-action

Animation

References

External links
  
 
 
 

1980 births
Living people
Japanese video game actresses
Japanese voice actresses
Sony Interactive Entertainment people
Production Baobab voice actors
Sigma Seven voice actors
Voice actresses from Shizuoka Prefecture
Voice actors from Hamamatsu
21st-century Japanese actresses